The Women's 200 metres at the 2011 World Championships in Athletics was held at the Daegu Stadium on September 1 and 2.

The defending three-time world champion Allyson Felix and reigning two time Olympic champion Veronica Campbell-Brown were the principal contenders, although both were aiming for sprint doubles of 200/400 m and 100/200 m, respectively. Shalonda Solomon was the world-leader before the championships with her run of 22.15 seconds which made her the 2011 US champion. Other contenders included Carmelita Jeter, who was second in the rankings, and Jeneba Tarmoh (the fourth American runner) who was ranked fifth.

The results of the three semifinals placed three Jamaicans and three Southern California athletes as the automatic qualifiers.  Debbie Ferguson-McKenzie and Hrystyna Stuy were the time qualifiers.

In the final, Campbell-Brown burst out of the blocks, making up the stagger on Solomon to her outside. In the home stretch, Campbell-Brown and Jeter separated from the rest of the field, until Campbell-Brown pulled ahead for a clear victory. Defending champion Felix, who looked sluggish throughout the season, closed fast to challenge Jeter near the line.

Medalists

Records
Prior to the competition, the records were as follows:

Qualification standards

Schedule

Results

Heats
Qualification: First 4 in each heat (Q) and the next 4 fastest (q) advance to the semifinals.

Wind:Heat 1: -0.1 m/s, Heat 2: -0.5 m/s, Heat 3: -0.3 m/s, Heat 4: +0.3 m/s, Heat 5: -0.2 m/s

Semifinals
Qualification: First 2 in each heat (Q) and the next 2 fastest (q) advance to the final.

Wind:Heat 1: -0.7 m/s, Heat 2: -0.1 m/s, Heat 3: -1.8 m/s

Final
Wind: -1.0 m/s

References

External links
200 metres results at IAAF website

200
200 metres at the World Athletics Championships
2011 in women's athletics